Aishbagh railway station used to serve the 130 years old metre-gauge railway network, and used to act as a terminal for it. On 15 May 2016 the gauge conversion process started in which the Aishbagh-Sitapur-Lakhimpur-Mailani section is being upgraded to broad gauge Mailani-Pilibhit getting delayed due to PTR NOC.

Before the gauge conversion Aishbagh Junction had five platforms. Their number will be increased to seven after completion of the gauge conversion. After GC process this station will be originating/terminating point for many north, northwest and northeast bound trains. Many Delhi and Izzat Nagar-bound trains will start from here. Station will also be provided with a loop line to bypass the trains which are not having a stop here. Other than this Transport nagar, Gomti Nagar, Utrahtia Jn and Daliganj Jn will be developed as satellite stations to pick the traffic pressure off Charbagh, Lucknow Junction and Badshah Nagar railway stations.
Right now Charbagh, Lucknow Junction, Daliganj Junction, Gomti nagar and Badshah Nagar – railway stations are originating/terminating railway stations in Lucknow.

Lines  
 Lucknow Jn. -Mailani Jn. - Kasganj Main Line
Lucknow Jn. - Barabanki Jn. Line
Aishbagh Jn. –Mailani Jn. (metre-gauge trains withdrawn in  2016)

References

Railway stations in Lucknow district